RC Strasbourg won Division 1 season 1978/1979 of the French Association Football League with 56 points.

Participating teams

 Angers SCO
 SEC Bastia
 Bordeaux
 Stade Lavallois
 Lille
 Olympique Lyonnais
 Olympique de Marseille
 FC Metz
 AS Monaco
 AS Nancy
 FC Nantes Atlantique
 OGC Nice
 Nîmes Olympique
 Paris FC
 Paris Saint-Germain FC
 Stade de Reims
 AS Saint-Etienne
 FC Sochaux
 RC Strasbourg
 US Valenciennes-Anzin

League table

Promoted from Division 2, who will play in Division 1 season 1979/1980
 Stade Brest:Runner-up, winner of Division 2 group B
 RC Lens:Third place, winner of barrages against Paris FC
 FC Gueugnon:Champion of Division 2, winner of Division 2 group A, will not play in Division 1 season 1979/1980 because of its amateur status.

Results

Relegation play-offs

|}

Top goalscorers

RC Strasbourg Winning Squad 1978-'79

Goal
 Dominique Dropsy
 Patrick Ottmann

Defence
 Raymond Domenech
 Jacky Duguépéroux (Cap.)
 Jacques Glassmann
 Jean-Jacques Marx
 Jacques Novi
 Léonard Specht
 Patrick Vincent

Midfield
 René Deutschmann
 Yves Ehrlacher
 Roger Jouve
 Eric Mosser
 Francis Piasecki
 Bernard Tischner
 Rémy Vogel
 Arsène Wenger

Attack
 Albert Gemmrich
 Remy Gentes
 Pascal Greiner
 Nabatingue Toko
 Joël Tanter
 Jacques Vergnes
 Roland Wagner
 André Wiss

Management
 Gilbert Gress (Coach)

References

 Division 1 season 1978-1979 at pari-et-gagne.com

Ligue 1 seasons
French
1